The men's synchronized trampoline competition in trampoline gymnastics at the 2009 World Games took place on 20 July 2009 at the Kaohsiung in Kaohsiung Arena, Chinese Taipei.

Competition format
A total of 12 pairs entered the competition. Best 8 duets from preliminary advances to the final.

Results

Preliminary

Final

References

External links
 Results on IWGA website

Trampoline gymnastics at the 2009 World Games